Kandjerramalh (Kenderramalh), also known as Pungupungu or Kuwema (Kuwama), is an Australian Aboriginal language from the Northern Territory in Australia.  Apart from being closely related to Wadjiginy, it is not known to be related to any other language.

The alternative names are ambiguous. "Kuwema" is also a name of the Tyaraity dialect of Malak-Malak, and "Pungupungu" is now used as a name of Malak-Malak proper.

References

External links
 Pungu Pungu (Kandjerramalh) at the Dalylanguages.org website.

Wagaydyic languages